Şamlı may refer to:
 Şamlı, Qabala, Azerbaijan
 Şamlı, Zangilan, Azerbaijan